The 2011 Sun Belt Conference men's basketball tournament was held in Hot Springs, Arkansas from March 5 to March 8 at the Summit Arena and the Convention Center Court.  All 12 Sun Belt teams participated in the tournament and their seedings are based on their conference record.

Format
The 12 members of the Sun Belt are split into two six team divisions. The top two seeds from both divisions receive byes to the quarterfinals. The first round will see inter-divisional match ups where the 3 will play the 6 seed and the 4 will play the 5 seed. The winners of the 3/6 match ups will play the 2 seeds and the winners of the 4/5 match ups will play the 1 seeds. The championship game will be broadcast on ESPN2.

Bracket

Asterisk denotes game ended in overtime.

References

Sun Belt Conference men's basketball tournament
Tournament
Sun Belt Conference men's basketball tournament
Sun Belt Conference men's basketball tournament